TSV Hartberg, known as TSV Egger Glass Hartberg for sponsorship purposes, is an Austrian association football club based in Hartberg, founded in 1946, which is currently playing in the Austrian Bundesliga.

History

The club was founded on 29 April 1946. They finished in 7th position in the 2007–2008 season while playing in the Third level Regionalliga. On the last day of the 2008–09 season, TSV Hartberg finished in first position of the Austrian Regionalliga East (third division). They won the eastern title and gained promotion to the 2009–10 Second Division. In the 2010–11 season they finished at 10th and bottom position but survived by winning the relegation play-off, and in the 2014–15 season they were relegated to the third division for finishing at the same bottom position.

TSV Hartberg were promoted to Second Division after winning the 2016–17 Regionalliga Mitte without having to compete in promotion play-offs as no team from the Regionalliga West or Ost applied for promotion. In the 2017–18 Second Division season, TSV Hartberg finished second to be promoted to the Austrian Bundesliga for the first time in their history, following an appeal to be granted a "license to play" in First Division. In the 2019–20 Austrian Bundesliga season, TSV Hartberg finished fifth to qualify to the 2020–21 UEFA Europa League qualifying phase. In the second qualifying round of the tournament the team lost to Polish Piast Gliwice and was eliminated from the competition.

European Record

Stadium
Stadion Hartberg is based in the Styria Hartberg district capital. It is a multipurpose sports facility, both for football matches and it is also suitable for athletics events. In addition, the stadium for other events such as music concerts. In 2006, the stadium of TSV Hartberg was expanded to that it could seat both home and away visitors with a capacity of 6,000 increasing from 4,500.

Current squad

Out on loan

Staff and board members

Sports

 President:  Brigitte Annerl
 Director of Football:  Erich Korherr
 Manager:   Klaus Schmidt
 Assistant manager:  Alexander Kontra
 Assistant manager:  Andreas Lienhart
 Assistant manager:  Alexander Marchat
 Goalkeeper coach:  Zoltán Varga
 Academy manager:   Christian Waldl

Manager history

 Unknown (1946–1994)
  Gerald Gamperl (1 July 1994 – 30 June 1996)
  Manfred Wirth (1 July 1996 – 20 April 1997)
  Hermann Wagner (27 April 1997 – 31 December 1997)
  Hans-Peter Schaller (1 January 1998 – 30 June 1999)
  Stefan Dörner (1 July 2000 – 25 November 2004)
  Norbert Barisits (1 January 2005 – 16 October 2006)
  Andrzej Lesiak (22 October 2006 – 31 May 2007)
  Bruno Friesenbichler (1 July 2007 – 30 June 2011)
  Kurt Garger (1 July 2011 – 31 March 2012)
  Walter Hörmann (1 April 2012 – 10 June 2012)
  Andreas Moriggl (11 June 2012 – 15 October 2012)
  Paul Gludovatz (15 October 2012 – 17 May 2013)
  Werner Ofner (interim) (17 May 2013 – 31 May 2013)
  Bruno Friesenbichler (1 July 2013 – 19 June 2014)
  Ivo Istuk (19 June 2014 – 17 July 2014)
  Bruno Friesenbichler (17 July 2014 – 4 June 2015)
  Christian Ilzer (5 June 2015 – 25 November 2015)
  Uwe Hölzl (12 December 2015 – 16 June 2016)
  Philipp Semlic/Uwe Hölzl (16 June 2016 – 30 June 2017)
  Christian Ilzer (1 July 2017 – 2018)
  Markus Schopp (2018 – 2021)
  Kurt Russ (2021 – 2022)
  Klaus Schmidt (2022 – )

References

External links
 
 Soccerway profile

 
Association football clubs established in 1946
Hartberg,TSV
1946 establishments in Austria